The 1969–70 Midland Football Combination season was the 33rd in the history of Midland Football Combination, a football competition in England.

Division One

Division One featured 18 clubs which competed in the division last season, no new clubs joined the division this season.

Also, Warwickshire Constabulary changed name to West Midlands Police.

League table

References

1969–70
M